Twice is the second album by American indie rock band The Tyde, released in 2003.

Track listing
All songs written by Darren Rademaker.

"A Loner" – 3:52
"Henry VIII" – 2:36
"Go Ask Yer Dad" – 4:17
"Best Intentions" – 4:54
"Crystal Canyons" – 1:59
"Takes A Lot Of Tryin'" – 4:24
"Memorable Moments" – 4:04
"Blood Brothers" – 3:15
"Shortboard City" – 2:39
"Breaking Up The Band" – 4:34
"New D" – 5:08

The Tyde albums
2003 albums